Xi Aquilae b (abbreviated ξ Aquilae b, ξ Aql b), formally named Fortitudo , is an extrasolar planet approximately 200 light-years from the Sun in the constellation of Aquila. The planet was discovered orbiting the yellow giant star Xi Aquilae in 2008. The planet has a minimum mass of 2.8 Jupiter and a period of 137 days.

Name
Following its discovery the planet was designated Xi Aquilae b. In July 2014 the International Astronomical Union launched NameExoWorlds, a process for giving proper names to certain exoplanets and their host stars. The process involved public nomination and voting for the new names. In December 2015, the IAU announced the winning name was Fortitudo for this planet.

The winning name was submitted by Libertyer, a student club at Hosei University of Tokyo, Japan. Fortitudo is Latin for 'fortitude'. Aquila is Latin for 'eagle', a symbol of fortitude – emotional and mental strength in the face of adversity.

See also 

 18 Delphini b
 41 Lyncis b

References

External links 
 

Aquila (constellation)
Giant planets
Exoplanets discovered in 2008
Exoplanets detected by radial velocity
Exoplanets with proper names